Azuriz Futebol Clube, known as Azuriz, is a Brazilian football team based in Marmeleiro, in the state of Paraná. Founded in 2018, the club plays in the Campeonato Paranaense, holding home matches at the Estádio Os Pioneiros in Pato Branco, with a capacity of 1,500 people.

History
Founded in February 2018 with focus on the youth categories, Azuriz had to register a first team in 2019 due to the Federação Paranaense de Futebol regulations. They finished fourth in the third division of the Campeonato Paranaense, but achieved promotion to the second division after Arapongas and Foz do Iguaçu decided not to play in the 2020 edition.

On 2 December 2020, Azuriz won the second division of the Paranaense after defeating Maringá.

Honours
Campeonato Paranaense Segunda Divisão: 2020

References

External links
  
 Soccerway team profile

2018 establishments in Brazil
Association football clubs established in 2018
Football clubs in Paraná (state)